
This is a list of players who graduated from the Challenge Tour in 2017. The top 15 players on the Challenge Tour rankings in 2017 earned European Tour cards for 2018.

* European Tour rookie in 2018
T = Tied
 The player retained his European Tour card for 2019 (finished inside the top 116).
 The player did not retain his European Tour card for 2019, but retained conditional status (finished between 117 and 155, inclusive).
 The player did not retain his European Tour card for 2019 (finished outside the top 155).

Rai earned promotion to the European Tour in July after his third Challenge Tour win of the season.

Runners-up on the European Tour in 2018

See also
2017 European Tour Qualifying School graduates

References

Challenge Tour
European Tour
Challenge Tour Graduates
Challenge Tour Graduates